Suis, a Latin adjective referring to the pig, may refer to:
 Swine brucellosis, an infection affecting pigs, known as Brucella suis
 Chlamydia suis, an infection affecting pigs
 Pseudomonas suis, a bacterium that causes pneumonia in pigs
 Streptococcus suis, a pathogen affecting pigs
 Trichuris suis, a worm species used in helminthic therapy
 Trypanosoma suis, a protozoan species that causes one form of the surra disease in pigs
 Sarcoptes scabiei var. suis, a mite subspecies
 Suis, the vocalist in the Japanese rock duo Yorushika

See also
 Sui (disambiguation)